Roseberry Parkway railway station (also known as Nunthorpe Parkway) is a proposed railway station which would be between  and  railway stations on the Esk Valley Line, in North Yorkshire, England. The station was proposed in August 2019 by a joint project between Redcar & Cleveland and Middlesbrough Councils and the Tees Valley Combined Authority. The project is "aimed at easing road congestion and improving access to East Cleveland".

A parkway station near Nunthorpe has been proposed since at least 2009 when funds were made available by the UK Government for studies into improving transport links in the East Cleveland area. The station was listed as Nunthorpe Parkway in the Tees Valley Metro Project documentation of 2010, though this maintained that any future station would be constructed after 2014. Roseberry Parkway station would serve an estimated population of 70,000 people and seek to encourage 30,000 car journeys away from the Marton Crawl, a name applied to the gridlock along the A-roads (A172 and A171) leading northwards into Middlesbrough.

Although an exact site is not yet proposed, it is suggested that the station is situated in the shadow of Roseberry Topping and would be a transport hub connecting pedestrians, bikes, cars and buses with trains. Trains to  would run half-hourly, with the prospect of trains to  being doubled.

References

External links
Initial proposal

Proposed railway stations in England